The Moscow Reserve Front was a front of the Red Army during the Second World War. It was formed on 9 October 1941 on the basis of the Moscow defensive line in the Volokolamsk, Mozhaisky Maloyaroslavets Kaluga and fortified areas. 

Soviet fronts
Military history of Moscow